Dersu Abolfathi (born February 24, 1991) is an American retired soccer player who played as a midfielder.

Career

College and amateur
Abolfathi played four years of college soccer at Stanford University, where he was named to the 2011 Capital One Academic All-District 8 Team and earned an Honorable Mention on the 2012 All-Pac-12 Team.

While at college, Abolfathi appeared for the USL PDL club Orange County Blue Star in 2011.

Professional career
Abolfathi signed with the United Soccer League club Orange County Blues on May 10, 2014.

References

1991 births
Living people
Stanford Cardinal men's soccer players
Orange County Blue Star players
Orange County SC players
OC Pateadores Blues players
Association football midfielders
Soccer players from California
USL League Two players
USL Championship players
American men's soccer players
Sportspeople from Irvine, California